Albert Peter Smedts (born 9 January 1952) is a former Australian rules footballer who initially played for Narre Warren, then with Waverley in the VFA from 1972 to 1974. 

Smedts played with North Albury in 1975 and 1976, kicking 15 goals, and featured in North Albury's best players in their 1975 Ovens & Murray Football League grand final loss to Wangaratta Rovers, prior to playing with Footscray from late 1976 to 1979.

Smedts then played with the St Kilda Football Club in the Victorian Football League (VFL) from 1980 to 1981.

Notes

External links 

		
Alby Smedts's playing statistics from The VFA Project

Living people
1952 births
Australian rules footballers from New South Wales
Waverley Football Club players
North Albury Football Club players
Western Bulldogs players
St Kilda Football Club players